Tullimbar is a suburb situated in the Macquarie Valley in the City of Shellharbour, New South Wales, Australia.

The location is named after the Aboriginal man and tribal leader Tullimbah (c.1798-c.1870).

A store was in operation at Tullimbar in 1856 by Robert Wilson. A Post Office was established at Tullimbar in 1872.
A school was opened at Tullimbar on 31 October 1881.

References 

City of Shellharbour